Viet Nam Travel Airlines JSC, operating as Vietravel Airlines, is a Vietnamese travel airline owned by the Vietravel Holdings, registered in Huế City, Thừa Thiên - Huế Province, Central Vietnam. The airline received its first Airbus A321 aircraft on December 5, 2020 and has its first commercial flight on 25th November 2021.

History
The airline was proposed in early 2018, and the dossiers were submitted to the Vietnamese relevant authorities for review. On April 3, 2020, the Prime Minister of Vietnam approved the establishment of the airline.

On October 29, 2020, Vietravel Airlines received the operation license from the Ministry of Transport.

On December 24, 2020, Vietravel Airlines received the Aircraft Operator Certificate (AOC) from the Civil Aviation Administration of Vietnam.

On December 26, 2020, the airline launched its maiden flight between Hanoi - Hue - Ho Chi Minh City.

On January 3, 2021, the carrier has announced its first charter routes from Hanoi and Ho Chi Minh City to Khanh Hoa, Qui Nhon and Phu Quoc.

On January 19, 2021, the airline started selling its first commercial tickets for scheduled flight between Hanoi and Ho Chi Minh City.

Currently, Vietravel Airlines has operating and expanding its routes to more than 10 destinations in Vietnam including: Ha Noi, Ho Chi Minh City, Da Nang, Quy Nhon, Phu Quoc, Nha Trang, Da Lat, Hue, Vinh, Hai Phong.

Fleet
As of February 2021, the Vietravel Airlines fleet include the following aircraft:

Destinations 

As of January 2021, Vietravel has announced the following routes and destinations:

References 

Airlines of Vietnam
Airlines established in 2019
Vietnamese brands
2019 establishments in Vietnam